Alberto Cruz may refer to:

Alberto Cruz (racewalker) (born 1972), Mexican racewalker
Alberto Cruz (soccer) (born 1971), American soccer player
Alberto Segismundo Cruz (1901–1987), Filipino poet, short story writer and novelist